The Microstomatidae (pencil smelts) are a family of marine smelts native to the Atlantic, Indian, and Pacific Oceans.

References
 
 

 
Deep sea fish
Marine fish families
Ray-finned fish families